Whitemoor Haye is a mainly agricultural area in the floodplain of the River Tame, near Alrewas in Staffordshire, England.

It is very popular with birdwatchers, as several rare species are either resident or seasonal visitors, notably the corn bunting.

The remains of several woolly rhinoceroses were recovered from a quarry here in 2002.

There is an airfield, for light aircraft such as microlights.

Nearby
A38
Croxall Lakes (Staffordshire Wildlife Trust)
National Memorial Arboretum

References

Birdwatching sites in England
Geography of Staffordshire